S-2 was a Soviet S-class submarine. In early 1940, it entered Swedish territorial waters in the Sea of Åland where it hit a Swedish naval mine, and sank on January 2, 1940 with the loss of all 50 crew members.

Wreck discovery
A search for the submarine wreck was begun in April 1999 by a team of divers from Sweden and Åland. According to the Military Archives of Sweden, the submarine hit the mine in Swedish territorial waters, but the Finnish archives specify the sinking occurred on Finnish territorial waters. The uncertainty of position necessitated a prolonged search. The diving team finally discovered the wreck inside Swedish territorial waters. One member of the diving team, Ingvald Eckerman, is a grandson of J. A. Eckerman who, as the lighthouse-keeper of the lighthouse at Märket, witnessed the submarine sinking in 1940.

The wreck was emptied of munitions during the summer of 2012.

References

Soviet S-class submarines
Ships built in the Soviet Union
1935 ships
World War II submarines of the Soviet Union
World War II shipwrecks in the Baltic Sea
Lost submarines of the Soviet Union
Ships sunk by mines
Maritime incidents in January 1940
1940 in the Soviet Union
Soviet Union–Sweden relations
Ships lost with all hands